Tuska may refer to:

Tuska, Iran, a village in Mazandaran Province, Iran
Tuska Open Air Metal Festival, in Helsinki
Tuska, a deity in the game RuneScape
Clarence D. Tuska, co-founder of the American Radio Relay League

See also

Toska (disambiguation)